Jowzchal (also Romanized as Jowzchāl and Jozchāl) is a village in Qaleh Miran Rural District, in the Central District of Ramian County, Golestan Province, Iran. At the 2006 census, its population was 39, in 8 families.

References 

Populated places in Ramian County